"You're Getting to Be a Habit with Me" is a 1932 popular song with music by Harry Warren and the lyrics by Al Dubin, which became a standard. The lyrics of the song were noted for its references to addiction.

It appears in the Warner Brothers musical film 42nd Street for which Warren and Dubin wrote three songs together. The song was inspired by one of the women working at the Warner Brothers studio, who when asked why she was still dating a certain man, said that he was getting to be a habit with her. In the movie, it is sung by the leading lady Dorothy Brock, played by Bebe Daniels.

The song was recorded by Guy Lombardo with Bing Crosby on vocals on January 12, 1933 and reached #1 in the charts. Crosby also included the song in the short film Please (1933). Another hit recording of the song in 1933 was by Fred Waring and His Pennsylvanians. 
The song was again performed by Doris Day in the musical Lullaby of Broadway in 1951. Since then it has been performed by a large number of artists.

Recorded versions

Betty Carter
Petula Clark 
Perry Como
Bebe Daniels
Doris Day
Skinnay Ennis
Alice Faye
Eydie Gormé
Earl Hines
Diana Krall
Nancy LaMott and Michael Feinstein
Peggy Lee
Guy Lombardo and his Royal Canadians feat. Bing Crosby.
Julie London
Barry Manilow
Shelly Manne
Maureen McGovern
Anita O'Day - An Evening with Anita O'Day (1956)
Jackie Paris
Dick Powell
Buddy Rich
Frank Sinatra - Songs for Swingin' Lovers (1956)
Elaine Stritch
Mel Tormé

Parodies
Allan Sherman recorded "You're Getting to Be a Rabbit with Me" on his 1963 album My Son, the Nut.

Other
Julie Stevens, a British actress, sings it in The Avengers television series. The episode, titled "The Decapod", first aired in 1962. She sings it in a lounge scene with a jazz combo accompanying her (piano, drums & upright bass).`

Uses in pop culture

In 1989, the song by Al Dubin was used in the Season One episode of the TV series Midnight Caller entitled "Blame it on Midnight".

References

Songs with music by Harry Warren
Songs with lyrics by Al Dubin
1932 songs
1933 singles
Bing Crosby songs
Doris Day songs
Diana Krall songs
Songs written for films